is a railway station in the city of Nikkō, Tochigi, Japan, operated by the Yagan Railway.

Lines
Kawaji-Yumoto Station is served by the Yagan Railway Aizu Kinugawa Line and is located 6.0 rail kilometers from end of the line at Shin-Fujiwara Station.

Station layout
The station has a single elevated side platform serving traffic in both directions, with the station building located underneath.

Adjacent stations

History
Kawaji-Yumoto Station opened on October 9, 1986.

Surrounding area
 
Kawaji Onsen 
Kawaji Post Office
Kawaji Dam

External links

Yagen Railway Station information 

Railway stations in Tochigi Prefecture
Railway stations in Japan opened in 1986
Nikkō, Tochigi